Yorktown High School is a public high school located in Arlington County, Virginia. There are around 240 teachers and 2100 students as of 2019. In 2022-23 school year, there were 2,577 students. Yorktown's attendance area makes up the northern third of Arlington County.

Yorktown is an accredited high school based on Virginia's Standards of Learning (SOL) examinations, and is accredited by the Southern Association of Colleges and Schools. The school is ranked among the top 100 schools in the nation according to Newsweek.

History 
The school building opened in January 1950 as an elementary school, The Yorktown School, and it served the community as such until it was converted into a high school.  It was called Yorktown from its opening.  At that time it was a one-story building and only housed the elementary students.

The high school opened for the first time for the 1960–61 school year, with only sophomores and juniors. The first graduating class was in 1962. The original elementary school was converted into a high school to relieve crowding at Washington-Liberty High School.

The school was threatened with closure in 1982 due to declining enrollment, but remained open due to community support. To boost the school's population, the attendance boundary between Washington-Liberty and Yorktown in the northeastern portion of the county was redrawn in 1983. Portions of the Donaldson Run, Cherrydale, Woodmont, Dover Crystal, and Old Dominion neighborhoods were transferred into a larger Yorktown district.

In the 1990s its boundaries expanded once again to serve the communities of Rosslyn, Courthouse, Clarendon, Westover, Halls Hill/Highview Park, and portions of Dominion Hills. An entirely new Yorktown facility opened for the 2013–14 school year, after several years of construction. The replacement campus was designed by Ehrenkrantz Eckstut & Kuhn Architects.

Building structure and location 
Additions have been made, enlarging the school, but leaving many of the older sections still incorporated within the walls, often still being used as classrooms. Yorktown is placed on a small parcel of land. The School Board does not own the adjacent athletic grounds, Greenbrier Park, which belong to Arlington County. Construction and renovation has been completed on Greenbrier Park. Individual softball and baseball fields have been installed along with a new turf field to be used for football, field hockey, soccer, and lacrosse. A rubberized track was added.

First a square, three-floor building was built and connected by a hallway to the old building. Over the next summer a long section of the new building was completed and attached directly to the first phase, and most of the old building was demolished leaving only a small section of science and music classrooms. The newest wing of the new building, the pool, and the gymnasium were then opened over winter break of the next year and the final section of the old building was demolished. As of the 2013–14 school year, the last wing was completed along with the courtyard.

Renovation 
Arlington proposed a Bond Package, approved by voters in 2000. As a result, in 2003, the school added an external wing to the school, containing classrooms and computer lab.

On May 8, 2006, the Arlington County School Board approved a preliminary design to rebuild the building. Voters approved about $25,000,000 for the project in the 2006 elections and $75,000,000 is on the ballot for next year. On February 1, 2007, the School Board unanimously approved the schematic design for the new Yorktown High School.

A new school building opened in September 2004. The athletic fields were renovated in 2007.

In January 2012, Phase II of the construction was completed, including three floors of classrooms, an eight-lane pool with diving well, a wrestling room, weight room and new main gym.

As of March 7, 2018, plans have been approved to go ahead with another renovation to increase the buildings capacity to 2,189 seats. The conversion will add at least 6 classrooms. The project will cost approximately $4,000,000.

Demographics 
As of the 2021-2022 school year, the school had an enrollment of 2,531 students and 143.69 classroom teachers (on a full-time equivalent basis), for a student–teacher ratio of 17.61:1. There were 196 students eligible for free lunch and 52 eligible for reduced-cost lunch.

The school's demographic breakdown of the 2022-2023 school year was as follows:

 61.2% Caucasian
 16.6% Hispanic
 7.4% Asian
 5.5% African-American
 0.2% American Indian/Alaskan Native
 0% Native Hawaiian / Other Pacific Islander
 9.1% Multiple

The vast majority of the school's students reside in the area of the county commonly called "North Arlington" which is the portion of the county north of Arlington Boulevard (US Route 50). The attendance area covers the high rise neighborhood of Rosslyn, which borders Georgetown, all the way to the more suburban neighborhoods of North Arlington bordering Falls Church and McLean. A small portion of McLean (22101) and a small portion of Falls Church (22046) within Arlington County are under the jurisdiction of the Arlington Public Schools and its students attend Yorktown. Many of the neighborhoods in the Yorktown attendance area are also zoned to Washington-Liberty High School. High school boundary changes between the two schools historically have occurred at least once every decade.

Academics

Performing arts 

Yorktown's winter guard has won gold medals in the Atlantic Indoor Association Championships in 2009 and 2010. After 2009 championships, they were promoted to the A3 class; in 2010 to A2.

The school has won Best Color Guard at the 2009 and 2010 USSBA State Championships.

The schools band program has been awarded the title of Virginia Honor Band 8 times, most recently in the 2017-2018 and 2021-2022 school years. 

Yorktown's Theatre Arts Program has won various awards. It received the Virginia Theatre Association (VTA) award in 2010. It was a finalist to compete in the Southeastern Theatre Conference. The 2011 and 2012 performances won both ensemble and acting awards from VTA. In 1999, their show ranked 1st in the state.

The Yorktown Sentry 
The school's newspaper, The Yorktown Sentry, has been in publication since 1959.

Sports
The school mascot is the Patriots.

Pool and stadiums 
Yorktown has a public partnership with Arlington County to use the athletic facilities of Greenbrier Park for softball, baseball, and track & field events.

The Yorktown swimming pool is operated by Arlington Public Schools. During the week, it is used for the high school physical education program of Yorktown and for students of neighboring elementary schools. The school's swim and dive teams use the facility.

Starting in 2002, the Arlington County School Board intended to spend over $700,000 on the installation and maintenance of new FieldTurf in various athletic fields and stadiums. In 2006, Yorktown's outdoor stadium was the last of the three Arlington high schools to undergo installation.

Football 
The Yorktown High School football team's head coach has been Bruce Hanson since 1984.

Yorktown State Championships since 2005
{| class="wikitable" style="float:center;"
|-
! colspan=3 | Virginia State Championships
|-
! Year
! Sport/Competition
!School
|-
|2005
|AAA Girls Swimming and Diving
|Yorktown
|-
|2006
|AAA Debate
|Yorktown
|-
|2006
|AAA Girls Swimming and Diving
|Yorktown
|-
|2007
|AAA Girls Swimming and Diving
|Yorktown
|-
|2007
|AAA Debate
|Yorktown
|-
|2008
|AAA Debate
|Yorktown
|-
|2009
|Men’s Rowing
|Yorktown
|-
|2017
|6A Girls Soccer
|Yorktown
|-
|2019
|Class 6 Girls Soccer
|Yorktown
|-
|2021
|Class 6 Girls Field Hockey
|Yorktown
|-
|2021
|Class 6 Girls Swimming and Diving
|Yorktown
|-
|2021
|Class 6 Boys Lacrosse
|Yorktown over Battlefield
|-
|2021
|Women’s Rowing
|Yorktown
|-
|2022
|Class 6 Girls Soccer
|Yorktown over Kellam
|-
|2022
|Class 6 Girls Lacrosse
|Yorktown over Battlefield
|-
|2023
|Class 6 Girls Swimming and Dive
|Yorktown
|}

Notable alumni

Paul Wellstone, 1962, American politician and U.S. Senator
James K. Baker, 1963, Entrepreneur and inventor who co-founded Dragon Systems and invented the model which is the basis for Apple Inc.'s Siri
Paul Laughton, 1963, Author Apple DOS 3.1, Author Atari BASIC, Named to the Virginia Tech Department of Science Hall Of Distinction.
Emily Couric, 1965, Virginia state senator
Beverly Johnson (climber), 1965, Pioneering rock climber and adventurer who skied across Greenland, windsurfed across the Bering Straits, and was the first person to solo cross the Straits of Magellan in open kayak
Heather McHugh, 1965, Poet, translator, educator and caregiver-respite provider
Daniel Blumenthal (pianist), 1970, Internationally renowned soloist, concert musician and chamber artist
Eric Schmidt, 1972, Executive Chairman, Google
David M. Brown c. 1974, U.S. Navy captain trained as an aviator and flight surgeon who died in the Space Shuttle Columbia disaster
Jeannemarie Devolites Davis c. 1974, politician
Katie Couric c. 1975, American journalist and author
Charles Monroe, 1975, Second African American elected to the Arlington County Board and its first chairman
David Charlebois, 1980, First Officer of hijacked Flight 77 which crashed into the Pentagon on 9/11/2001
Rich Lowry, 1986, Editor, National Review
Greg Garcia, c. 1988, TV producer
Tom Dolan, 1993, Olympic gold medalist swimmer
M.J. Stewart, 2014, Football Player for the Cleveland Browns
Torri Huske, 2021, 2020 Olympics swimmer

References

External links

Arlington County Public Schools
Yorktown High School
The Yorktown Sentry

1960 establishments in Virginia
Educational institutions established in 1960
Public high schools in Virginia
Universities and colleges accredited by the Southern Association of Colleges and Schools
Schools in Arlington County, Virginia